Bohemian (Japanese: ボヘミアン; stylized as BOHEMIAN), is a three-member South Korean pop/ballad group, that along with group endeavors, has recorded many soundtracks, abbreviated as OSTs, for South Korean films and Korean drama or k-drama for television in South Korea, as individual artists.  The group is composed of Park Sang Woo, Kim Yong Jin, and Yoo Kyu Sang. Bohemian debuted in 2010 with members Park Sang Woo and Yoo Kyu Sang. In 2012, they were joined by Kim Yong Jin. The group is managed by HMG Entertainment, with recordings released by their distribution company, LOEN Entertainment. Through a LOEN Entertainment agreement with Viki, a video streaming site, both Kim Yong Jin and Bohemian are listed as artists, and their music videos can be viewed.

History

Park Sang Woo is the group's leader.  He was born on April 16, 1986, is 185 cm tall and has a level 2 Taekwondo certification. Park is a regular cast member of Saturday Night Live Korea or SNL Korea on cable network TVN or tvN. One of Park's OSTs was "I Love You Again and Again" for the 2009 drama The City Hall.
From December, 2013 - January, 2014 Park performed as dancer/chorus, with solo for the musical "December: Unfinished Song", written and directed by Jang Jin and performed at Sejong Center, with lead roles performed by Junsu of JYJ and actor/singer Park Gun-hyung. On March 14, 2014, Park announced on Twitter his sudden decision to enter the military, and entered quietly on March 18.

Yoo Kyu Sang, the youngest of the group, was born on June 22, 1988, and is 181 cm tall. Yoo started an early modeling career at Cheonan High School, and participated in a 2010 music video released by Psy and Kim Jang-hoon, "Ring For Me Once Again".

The duo debuted as Bohemian in 2010, released their first album, "Love Letter", and appeared on several televised music programs with the single of the same title.

Kim Yong Jin, the oldest of the group, was born on October 18, 1982, and is 178 cm tall.  Kim graduated from Yeoju Institute of Technology and has completed his Conscription in South Korea. Kim is also known by the single letter "I" and released his first album, "Soulmate" in 2007. One of Kim's latest OSTs was the theme song "Hurt" for the drama Cruel City, also known as Heartless City, which aired on JTBC from May–July, 2013. On December 3, 2015, Kim appeared as a "skilled vocalist" participant on I Can See Your Voice, singing one of his Spring Day OSTs.

After Kim Yong Jin joined Bohemian in 2012, the group released albums "Don't Hurt" and "There Is No Sun",
followed by appearances on several music programs with singles, of the same titles. On variety shows, Park Sang Woo has done singing impressions, including Girls' Generation "The Boys". Also on variety shows, Bohemian members Park Sang Woo and Yoo Kyu Sang have done a dance parody of Michael Jackson "Billie Jean" and Rain "Rainism"; and Kim Yong Jin has performed a couple's dance with comedian Sayuri. Bohemian's latest digital single, "Send, Bye, Sorry" was released August 2, 2013.

Discography

Albums

Singles

Soundtracks

Film

TV Series

Concerts and Performances
 Lotte World, August 8(2012)
 Banpo Music Festival, June 8 (2013)

Musicals

Television

Music Shows

Inkigayo

Music Bank

M! Countdown

Show Champion

Other appearances

Radio

Others

 Digital Single, 2013, Kim Yong-Jin (Bohemian), Yoo Seong Eun(용진(보헤미안), 유성은)- "Don't Be Sick(아프지마)"

References

External links

Bohemian 보헤미안, Artist, on Naver 

Ballad music groups
K-pop music groups
Musical groups established in 2010
South Korean musical trios
South Korean pop music groups
2010 establishments in South Korea